Melodifestivalen 2020 was the 60th edition of the Swedish music competition Melodifestivalen. The competition was organised by Sveriges Television (SVT) and took place over a six-week period between 1 February and 7 March 2020. The winner of the competition was The Mamas with the song "Move", who would have represented Sweden in the Eurovision Song Contest 2020 in Rotterdam, Netherlands. The Mamas were the first band to win since 2007 and the first female act to win since 2014; this is the fourth time in the history of Melodifestivalen that Sweden was unable to send a song to the Eurovision Song Contest (and the first such occurrence since 1976), as the contest itself was cancelled on 18 March 2020 due to the COVID-19 pandemic. 

The format of the competition consisted of 6 shows: 4 heat rounds, a second chance round and a final. An initial 28 entries were selected for the competition through three methods: an open call for song submissions, direct invitations to specific artists and songwriters, and a wildcard given to one of the artists that participated in the P4 Nästa competition organised by Sveriges Radio P4. The 28 competing entries were divided into four heats, with seven compositions in each. From each heat, the songs that earn first and second place qualify directly to the final, while the songs that place third and fourth proceed to the Second Chance round. The bottom three songs in each heat were eliminated from the competition. An additional four entries qualified from the Second Chance round to the final, bringing the total number of competing entries in the final to 12. All 6 shows were hosted by Lina Hedlund, Linnea Henriksson and David Sundin.

Format 
Melodifestivalen 2020, organised by Sveriges Television (SVT), was the nineteenth consecutive edition of the contest in which the competition took place in different cities across Sweden; this was the last time that the event was held in this format. The four heats were held in the Saab Arena in Linköping (1 February), the Scandinavium in Gothenburg (8 February), the Coop Norrbotten Arena in Luleå (15 February) and the Malmö Arena in Malmö (22 February). The Second Chance round took place in the Stiga Sports Arena in Eskilstuna on 29 February, while the final was held in the Friends Arena in Stockholm on 7 March. A total of 28 entries competed in the heats, with seven entries taking part in each show. The top two entries from each heat advanced directly to the final, while the third and fourth placed entries advanced to the Second Chance round. The bottom three entries in each heat were eliminated. An additional four entries qualified for the final from the Second Chance round, bringing the total number of competing entries in the final to 12.

Presenters 
On 3 September 2019, Lina Hedlund, Linnea Henriksson and David Sundin were announced as the presenters of the 60th edition of Melodifestivalen.

Competing entries 
The twenty-eight competing entries were announced to the public during a press conference on 26 November 2019. On 2 February 2020, it was announced that Thorsten Flinck would be disqualified from the competition due to the fact that criminal charges of unlawful threat and vandalism had been filed against him. One day later, Jan Johansen was announced as his replacement.

Heats

Heat 1 
The first heat took place on 1 February 2020 in the Saab Arena in Linköping. More than 454,000 SEK was collected for Radiohjälpen.

Heat 2 
The second heat took place on 8 February 2020 in the Scandinavium arena in Gothenburg.

Heat 3 
The third heat took place on 15 February 2020 in the Coop Norrbotten Arena in Luleå.

Heat 4 
The fourth heat took place on 22 February 2020 in the Malmö Arena in Malmö.

Second Chance 
The Second Chance round took place on 29 February 2020 in the Stiga Sports Arena in Eskilstuna. This was the first time in the history of the competition that Eskilstuna hosted a Melodifestivalen round.

Final 
The final took place on 7 March 2020 in the Friends Arena in Stockholm.

COVID-19 considerations 

SVT issued a Q&A section on their official website to address concerns regarding the spread of COVID-19. On 3 March, four days before the Melodifestivalen final, Swedish state radio station Sveriges Radio (SR) reported over 200 confirmed cases within Sweden.

The questions and answers are related to safety measures and the number of participants. 27,000 audience members, including international audience members, were anticipated. This number did not include the audiences for the two dress rehearsals or any personnel. SVT stated on the Q&A page that they would not establish checkpoints or other containment measures.

Gallery

Heat 1 – Linköping

Heat 2 – Göteborg

Heat 3 – Luleå

Heat 4 – Malmö

Final – Stockholm

References

External links 
 Melodifestivalen Official Site

2020 song contests
February 2020 events in Sweden
Eurovision Song Contest 2020
March 2020 events in Sweden
2020
2020s in Gothenburg
2020s in Malmö
2020s in Stockholm
Events in Eskilstuna
Events in Gothenburg
Events in Linköping
Events in Luleå
Events at Malmö Arena
Events in Solna
2020 in Swedish music
2020 Swedish television seasons
2020 in Swedish television